Bangall is a former rural locality in the Barcaldine Region, Queensland, Australia.

On 22 November 2019 the Queensland Government decided to amalgamate the localities in the Barcaldine Region, resulting in five expanded localities based on the larger towns: Alpha, Aramac, Barcaldine, Jericho and Muttaburra. Bangall was incorporated into Muttaburra.

Geography 
Bangall Creek and Western Creek flow through the locality towards the south-east, eventually becoming tributaries of the Thomson River and hence part of the Lake Eyre basin.

The predominant land use is cattle grazing.

Education 
There are no schools in Bangall. The nearest primary schools are in Muttaburra and Winton and the nearest secondary schools are in Aramac, Barcaldine, Longreach and Winton.

References 

Barcaldine Region
Unbounded localities in Queensland